is an anime television series by Pierrot. The 50-episode series aired on Nippon Television from April 1991 to August 1992. It is based on the Little Ghosts book series published by Poplar.

The story is about three mischievous obake who have taken up different jobs. They mostly cause mischief through their neighborhood.

The anime was dubbed by Saban under the title "Three Little Ghosts" and was widely distributed to Poland and Scandinavia (mostly Sweden).

Characters
  A cook who lives in an attic. He enjoys cooking and eating in general. Voiced by Yōko Teppōzuka (Japanese); Sonja Ball (English).
   A hairdresser who is very skilled. Voiced by Akiko Yajima (Japanese); Sonja Ball (English).
  The only female of the obake. She enjoys eating sweets. Voiced by Taeko Kawata (Japanese); Patricia Rodriguez (English).

See also
 List of ghost films

References

External links
Little Ghosts, There, Here, and Where - English
Chiisa na Obake Atchi, Kotchi, Sotchi (Japanese)
 

1991 anime television series debuts
Fictional ghosts
Nippon TV original programming
Pierrot (company)
Television series by Saban Entertainment